Anastasios Soulis (born 8 January 1987) is a Swedish actor. He was born to a Greek father, Georgios Soulis and a Finnish mother, Katariina Nerg.

Selected filmography
2000 - Den bästa sommaren
2001 - Hem ljuva hem
2001 - Gryningsland 
2002 - Alla älskar Alice
2002 - Det brinner!
2003 - Emma och Daniel: Mötet
2004 - Tre solar
2006 - Underbara älskade
2007 - Beck – Det tysta skriket
2008 - Les Grandes Personnes
2009 - Prinsessa
2009 - De halvt dolda (TV)
2009 - Bröllopsfotografen
2009 - Johan Falk – Gruppen för särskilda insatser
2009 - Johan Falk – Vapenbröder
2009 - Johan Falk – National Target
2010 - Maria Wern - Alla de stillsamma döda (TV)
2012 - Johan Falk – Spelets regler
2012 - Johan Falk – De 107 Patrioterna
2012 - Johan Falk – Alla råns moder
2012 - Johan Falk – Organizatsija Karayan
2012 - Johan Falk – Barninfiltratören
2013 - Rendez-vous à Kiruna
2013 - Crimes of Passion
2015 - En underbar jävla jul
2018 - Lykkeland (State of Happiness)
2021 - Red Dot

References

External links
Anastasios Soulis

1987 births
Living people
Male actors from Stockholm
Swedish people of Greek descent
Swedish people of Finnish descent
Swedish male film actors
Swedish male television actors
21st-century Swedish male actors